Mercantile Marine Academy may refer to:

Mercantile Marine Academy (Kolkata)
Mercantile Marine Academy (Chittagong)